First Church of Christ in Euclid (also known as the First United Presbyterian Church of East Cleveland) is a historic church at 16200 Euclid Avenue in East Cleveland, Ohio.

It was built in 1893 and added to the National Register in 1978.

References

Presbyterian churches in Ohio
Churches on the National Register of Historic Places in Ohio
Churches completed in 1893
19th-century Presbyterian church buildings in the United States
East Cleveland, Ohio
Churches in Cuyahoga County, Ohio
National Register of Historic Places in Cuyahoga County, Ohio